Thorsten Röcher (born 11 June 1991) is an Austrian professional footballer who plays for Wolfsberger AC.

Career
On 9 May 2018 he played as Sturm Graz beat Red Bull Salzburg in extra time to win the 2017–18 Austrian Cup.

On 4 July 2019, while under contract at FC Ingolstadt, he returned to Sturm Graz on loan with a purchase option.

Honours
Sturm Graz
 Austrian Cup: 2017–18

References

1991 births
People from Neunkirchen District, Austria
Living people
Austrian footballers
Association football midfielders
SV Mattersburg players
SK Sturm Graz players
FC Ingolstadt 04 players
Wolfsberger AC players
Austrian Football Bundesliga players
2. Liga (Austria) players
Austrian Regionalliga players
2. Bundesliga players
Austrian expatriate footballers
Expatriate footballers in Germany
Austrian expatriate sportspeople in Germany
Footballers from Lower Austria